Camini is a comune (municipality) in the Province of Reggio Calabria in the Italian region Calabria, located about  south of Catanzaro and about  northeast of Reggio Calabria.

Camini borders the following municipalities: Riace, Stignano, Stilo.

Main sights
A Turri, a 16th-century towers
Santa Maria Assunta in Cielo, a 12th-century church with frescoes

References

Cities and towns in Calabria
Vallata dello Stilaro